Yenisey Krasnoyarsk (Russian "Енисей Красноярск") may refer to:

 Yenisey Krasnoyarsk Bandy Club
 BC Yenisey Krasnoyarsk, men's basketball club
 FC Yenisey Krasnoyarsk, football club
 Yenisey-STM Krasnoyarsk, rugby club
 VC Yenisey Krasnoyarsk, women's volleyball club